Roman Festivals (Italian: Feste Romane), P 157 is a tone poem in four movements for orchestra completed in 1928 by the Italian composer Ottorino Respighi. It is the last of his three tone poems about Rome, following Fountains of Rome (1916) and Pines of Rome (1924), which he referred to as a triptych. Each movement depicts a scene of celebration in ancient and contemporary Rome, specifically gladiators battling to the death, the Christian Jubilee, a harvest and hunt festival, and a festival in the Piazza Navona. Musically, the piece is the longest and most demanding of Respighi's Roman trilogy.

The premiere was held on 21 February 1929 at Carnegie Hall in New York City, with Arturo Toscanini conducting the New York Philharmonic. The piece was published by Casa Ricordi in the same year.

Overview
Having completed the work, Respighi felt that he had incorporated the "maximum of orchestral sonority and colour" from the orchestra and could no longer write such large scale pieces. It was at this time he started to favour compositions for smaller ensembles. Although Roman Festivals is generally considered as less successful than its two predecessors, conductor and Respighi interpreter Yan Pascal Tortelier points to the "really inspired mix of sophisticated orchestration, chromaticism, harmony and powerful driving rhythms" used in the piece, and judges "La Befana" as "exuberant, almost orgiastic" and "much more varied and satisfying musically" than the similarly eruptive final movement of Pines of Rome.

Movements

The piece consists of four movements, for which Respighi wrote programmatic notes describing each scene.

"Circus Games" depicts the ancient contests in which gladiators battled to the death, with the sound of trumpet fanfares. Strings and woodwinds suggest the plainchant of the first Christian martyrs which are heard against the snarls of the beasts against which they are pitted. The movement ends with violent orchestral chords, complete with organ pedal, as the martyrs succumb. "The Jubilee" portrays the every-fiftieth-year festival in the Papal tradition (see Christian Jubilee). Respighi quotes the German Easter hymn, "Christ ist erstanden". Pilgrims approaching Rome catch a breath-taking view from Mt. Mario, as church bells ring in the background. "The October Harvest" represents the harvest and hunt festival in Rome. The French horn solo celebrates the harvest as bells and a mandolin portray love serenades. "The Epiphany" takes place in the Piazza Navona. Trumpets sound again and create a festive clamour of Roman songs and dances, including a barrel organ and a drunken reveler depicted by a solo tenor trombone.

Instrumentation

Feste romane is scored for the following large orchestra, including some unusual instruments intended to suggest music of earlier times:

Woodwinds: 3 flutes (3rd doubling piccolo), 2 oboes, cor anglais, 2 clarinets in B-flat and A, piccolo clarinet in D, bass clarinet in B-flat and A, 2 bassoons, and contrabassoon
Brass: 4 horns in F, 4 trumpets in B-flat and A, 2 tenor trombones, bass trombone, bass tuba and 3 soprano buccine in B-flat1
Percussion: timpani, bells, glockenspiel, cymbals, bass drum with cymbals, field drum, snare drum, ratchet, sleigh bells, tambourine, tam-tam, triangle, high and low wood blocks (horse hooves), and xylophone
Keyboard: piano (2 and 4 hands), and organ
Strings: mandolin, 1st and 2nd violins, violas, violoncellos, and double basses
1 Respighi noted that the buccine may be replaced by trumpets, a substitution which most modern orchestras make.

Performances and recordings
Arturo Toscanini and the New York Philharmonic premiered the music in Carnegie Hall on 21 February 1929. Toscanini recorded it with the Philadelphia Orchestra in the Academy of Music in 1942 for RCA Victor. He recorded it again with the NBC Symphony Orchestra in Carnegie Hall in 1949, again for RCA. Both recordings were issued on LP and CD. Indeed, the 1949 performance pushed the very limits of the recording equipment of the time as Toscanini insisted the engineers capture all of the dynamics of the music, especially in "Circus Games" and "Epiphany".

The piece was first performed in Italy at the Augusteo in Rome on 17 March 1929, by the Orchestra of the Accademia di Santa Cecilia under Bernardino Molinari.

Arrangements
This work was transcribed (in the original key) for the United States Marine Band by Don Patterson in 2010. This transcription was recorded on the CD Feste, conducted by Michael J. Colburn.

Appearances

The movement "Circenses" was played on BBC Radio 4 Educational Radio series in the 1980s, Roman Britain during an introduction. 
The movement "Circenses" was used in the 1947 American film Fireworks.
The movement "Circenses" appeared in Sydney New Year's Eve in 2003/2004.

References

External links

Symphonic poems by Ottorino Respighi
Orchestral suites
1928 compositions
Music for orchestra and organ
Music about Rome